Hans Kofi Boni is a Ghanaian politician during the first republic of Ghana. He was the Member of parliament (MP) for Ho West.

Member of parliament
Boni was a member of the Convention People's Party (CPP) led by Kwame Nkrumah. He was elected as the MP for Ho West during the first republic. He was sworn in on 11 August 1960. In the 1965 Ghanaian parliamentary election, 198 MPs representing the CPP were elected unopposed following the increase in the powers of the President of Ghana by the 1964 Constitutional Amendments. He served as the member of parliament for Yingor constituency until the 24th February 1966 coup d'état which overthrew the civilian government and replaced it with the National Liberation Council (NLC) military government.

Minister in government
Boni served as the Volta Regional Commissioner between 1961 and 1965 in the Nkrumah government. He was one of seven Regional Commissioners (Regional Ministers) invited by the United States  to tour the USA following their visit to the Soviet Union. While in this position, Boni who is a native of Kpedze, advised the Kpedze Youth Association to invest in the construction of a secondary school. This led to the foundation of the Kpedze Senior High School in October 1962.

Jail sentence
In 1969, Boni was sentenced to six years imprisonment with "productive hard labour" by an Accra High Court presided over by Justice E. K. Wiredu. He was found guilty together with Joseph Kodzo of inappropriate disbursement of funds of the then Industrial Development Corporation (IDC). They were both former Volta Regional Commissioners in Kwame Nkrumah's government. His defence was that he was carrying out the orders of Nkrumah but this was not accepted by the presiding judge.

References

Living people
Ghanaian MPs 1956–1965
Ghanaian MPs 1965–1966
Convention People's Party (Ghana) politicians
Ewe people
People from Volta Region
1927 births